Roger Federer was the defending champion and successfully defended his title, defeating Alejandro Falla in the final, 7–6(7–2), 7–6(7–3).

Seeds
The top four seeds received a bye into the second round.

Draw

Finals

Top half

Bottom half

Qualifying

Seeds
The top six seeds receive a bye into the second round.

Qualifiers

Lucky losers
  Albano Olivetti

Qualifying draw

First qualifier

Second qualifier

Third qualifier

Fourth qualifier

References

 Main Draw
 Qualifying Draw

2014 Gerry Weber Open